Rojavai Killathe is a 1993 Indian Tamil-language romantic action film directed by Suresh Krissna. A remake of the 1988 Hindi film Tezaab, it stars Arjun and Khushbu with Tiger Prabhakar as the antagonist. The film was released on 3 December 1993.

Plot 

Alexander is a henchman who works for the smuggler Peter, and Alexander are considered by Peter as his faithful henchman. Peter often confronts his enemy Ayyanar. Ayyanar forces the innocent Anu to dance on stage, and he ill-treats her. Peter orders Alexander to kill Ayyanar's weak point, Anu. Alexander cannot kill her and finally shoots on her shoulder. Wounded, Anu is admitted to the hospital. Then, Alexander decides to save her from Peter and Ayyanar.

Cast 

Arjun as Alexander (Duraipandi)
Khushbu as Anu
Radha Ravi as Ayyanar
Tiger Prabhakar as Peter
Goundamani as David
Senthil as T.V.Thandavarayan
Vadivelu
Sarath Babu as Sathasivam, Alexander's brother
Vennira Aadai Moorthy
Arunkumar
Oru Viral Krishna Rao
Ra. Sankaran as Somanathan, Anu's father
Renuka as Sathasivam's wife
Sharmili as David's wife
Suryakala
LIC Narasimhan as a doctor
Nalinikanth
Master Robert as Naina

Soundtrack 
The soundtrack was composed by Deva, with lyrics by Vairamuthu.

Reception 
The Indian Express wrote, "Director Suresh Krishna's takings are slick and sophisticated. He has used his cinematographer Prakash to good effect. The visuals are crisp and elegant, the locations lush and inviting. But that's all there is to the film, the flashiness." K. Vijiyan of New Straits Times wrote, "Director Suresh Krishna should have concentrated more on building up the story instead of just the stunts".

References

External links 
 

1990s romantic action films
1990s Tamil-language films
1990s vigilante films
1993 films
Films directed by Suresh Krissna
Films scored by Deva (composer)
Indian romantic action films
Indian vigilante films
Tamil remakes of Hindi films